for winners of the pacing event see: Inter Dominion Pacing Championship

The Inter Dominion Trotting Championship Grand Final was a race for trotters within the overall Inter Dominion series. The series is held each year, and is a harness racing competition for both trotters and pacers that has been contested since 1936 in Australia and New Zealand. The host of the series is rotated between the 6 harness racing states of Australia and the North and South Islands of New Zealand. However, in recent years the Trotting series has mainly been held in Victoria with other Australian states reluctant to host the series. It forms part of the overall Inter Dominion series for pacers and trotters.

The rotation of the Championships was fixed annually at a meeting of the Council, five years in advance. It is held in New Zealand once in each four years. The Championships are held once in each racing year at a time and venue approved by the Council by the completion of the Championships in the preceding year. The Grand Circuit race is not held at the same time as the Championships.

A meeting with leading Australasian harness racing officials led to a decision that the Inter Dominion Trotting Championship would be discontinued after 2012. Several new major trotting races have been created to replace the series, most notably the Great Southern Star at Melton in March, which was to be run with a one-day heat and final format.

The Trotting Championship was re-introduced in 2018.

Trotting Championship Winners

2022 Inter Dominion (Victoria)

The 2022 Inter Dominion started on 26 November 2022 at Ballarat with 3 heats each for pacers and trotters, all run over 2200m. The second night, Tuesday 29 November, is at Shepparton and the heats were 1690m.  The third night, 3 December, was at Geelong and the races 2570m. On 10 December the finals are held at Melton and each race is run over 2760m.

The points awarded during the heats are: 1st (16 points), 2nd (13), 3rd (11), 4th (9), 5th (8), 6th (7), 7th (6), 8th (5), 9th (4), 10th (3), 11th (2) and 12th (1).

The stake for the trotting heats was $25,000 while the Grand Final was worth $250,000.

New Zealand's sole entrant in the 2022 series Bolt For Brilliance was withdrawn after suffering a fractured pedal bone, pulling up lame following his second place in his final heat.

2021 Inter Dominion (New South Wales) 

There was no Inter Dominion in 2020.  The 2021 Inter Dominions were held from Saturday 27 November 2021 to 11 December 2021.  The first round of heats and the finals were held at Menangle Park Paceway while the second and third rounds of heats were at Bathurst and Newcastle respectively.

Due to COVID-19 a significant number of horses, particularly from New Zealand, were unable to compete.

Horses that were in the final rankings but did not compete included:
 5 - Keayang Livana - Margaret Lee, Vic  
 6 - Magicool - Rob O'Connell, Vic
 7 -  Cover Of Darkness - Emma Stewart, Vic
 9 - Is That A Bid - Michael Hughes, Vic
 18 - Majestic Simon NZ - Chantal Turpin, Qld 
 19 - Travel Bug - Jason McNaulty, Vic 
 21 - Brandlo Prince - Chris Svanosio  
 22 - Gimondi NZ - Blake Fitzpatrick, NSW  
 25 - Hatchback - John Justice, Vic

2019 Inter Dominion (Auckland) 

The 2019 Inter Dominions were held in Auckland, New Zealand, hosted by the Auckland Trotting Club at the Alexandra Park track from Friday 29 November 2019 to 15 December 2019.
 
2019 Rowe Cup winner Sundees Son initially led the Inter Dominion Rankings for Trotters but was withdrawn in October 2019.  Also withdrawn were Lemond and Kyvalley Blur who were initially ranked 6th and 9th respectively. After the first night trainer, Andy Garth, withdrew Mclovin due to a viral infection causing leg swelling.
 
Heats 1 and 2 on Friday 29 November were over 2200m with a mobile start and Free-for-all conditions.

 Heat 1 was won by Paramount King (Joshua Dickie, $28.00) from Massive Metro (Todd Mitchell) and Big Jack Hammer (Luke McCarthy) in 2:40.41 (mile rate - 1:57.3).
 Heat 2 was carried out by Winterfell (Mark Purdon, $7.70) from Marcoola (Sharee Tomlinson) and Majestic Man (Brad Williamson) in 2:41.57 (mile rate - 1:58.1).

Heat 3 and 4 on Tuesday 3 December were raced over 1700m.

 Heat 3 was won by Majestic Man (Brad Williamson, $2.80) from Habibi Inta (Blair Orange) and Massive Metro (Todd Mitchell) in 2:02.2 (mile rate - 1:55.6).
 Heat 4 was won by Temporale (Tony Herlihy, $2.90) from Marcoola (Sheree Tomlinson) and Paramount King (Josh Dickie) in 2:03.67 (mile rate 1:57.0).

Heat 5 and 6 on Friday 6 December were raced over 2700m.

 Heat 5 was won by Temporale (Tony Herlihy, $4.40) from Paramount King (Joshua Dickie) and Tough Monarch (Anthony Butt) in 3:23.81 (mile rate - 2:01.4  ).
 Heat 6 was won by Winterfell (Mark Purdon, $2.30) from Massive Metro (Todd Mitchell) and  Majestic Man (Brad Williamson) in 3:20.55 (mile rate - 1:59.5 ).

The Grand final (2700m) held on 14 December was won by Winterfell (Mark Purdon) in 3:21.6 (mile rate -  2:00.1) from Majestic Man (Brad Williamson) and Massive Metro (Todd Mitchell).

See also

 Harness racing in Australia
 Harness racing in New Zealand

References

External links
 2009 Watpac Inter Dominion Official Site
 Rotation Program - Inter Dominion Championship Series
 Queensland Harness Racing Homepage - Host state for 2009 Inter Dominion

Recurring sporting events established in 1936
Harness races in Australia
Australasian Grand Circuit Races
Trotting Championship

Inter Dominion winners